Vandana Slatter (born 1964) is a Canadian-American politician, pharmacist, and scientist serving as a member of the Washington State House of Representatives from the 48th district.

Early life and education 
Slatter was born in Vanderhoof, British Columbia, the daughter of Indian immigrants. Her father is a doctor.
Slatter earned a Bachelor of Science degree in pharmacy from the University of British Columbia, Doctor of Pharmacy from the University of Washington, and Master of Public Administration from the Evans School of Public Policy and Governance. While studying for her master's degree, Slatter worked in the office of U.S. Senator Maria Cantwell.

Career 
Slatter worked as a clinical pharmacist for Amgen. Slatter served on the city council of Bellevue, Washington. After Patty Kuderer was chosen to succeed Cyrus Habib, who had been elected Lieutenant Governor of Washington, in the Washington Senate, Slatter was chosen to succeed Kuderer in the Washington House.

Personal life 
Slatter and her husband, Greg, have one son. After earning her bachelor's degree, Slatter and her husband moved to Michigan. Slatter became a U.S. citizen in 2001.

References

External links

1964 births
Living people
American politicians of Indian descent
Women state legislators in Washington (state)
Washington (state) city council members
Democratic Party members of the Washington House of Representatives
21st-century American politicians
21st-century American women politicians
People from Bellevue, Washington
Women city councillors in Washington (state)
Canadian emigrants to the United States
People from the Regional District of Bulkley-Nechako